Kayra Sayit (born Ketty Mathé on 13 February 1988) is a French-born Turkish European champion female judoka competing in the +78 kg division.

Coming from Saint-Brieuc-de-Mauron in Brittany, she competed for France until her marriage in Turkey in February 2015. She then changed her name from Ketty Mathé to Kayra Sayit, and began to compete for Turkey after acquiring the Turkish citizenship.

She was a finalist in Prague in 2011, and was selected along with fellow Breton Laëtitia Payet for the World Championships in judo from 23 to 28 August in Paris-Bercy.

In 2016, she won the gold medal at Grand Prix Tbilisi, and at the European Judo Championships in Kazan, Russia.

In 2021, she won one of the bronze medals in her event at the 2021 Judo World Masters held in Doha, Qatar. She took the gold medal at the 2021 European Judo Championships in Lisbon, Portugal. She competed in the women's +78 kg event at the 2020 Summer Olympics in Tokyo, Japan.

She won the gold medal in the women's +78 kg event at the 2022 Mediterranean Games held in Oran, Algeria.

Achievements
.

Medal winner in senior tournaments only.

References

External links

 
 
 

1988 births
Sportspeople from Morbihan
French people of Martiniquais descent
French female judoka
French emigrants to Turkey
Naturalized citizens of Turkey
Turkish female judoka
Turkish female martial artists
Turkish people of Martiniquais descent
Turkish people of French descent
European champions for Turkey
Living people
Judoka at the 2016 Summer Olympics
Judoka at the 2020 Summer Olympics
Olympic judoka of Turkey
Mediterranean Games gold medalists for Turkey
Mediterranean Games medalists in judo
Competitors at the 2018 Mediterranean Games
Competitors at the 2022 Mediterranean Games
European Games competitors for Turkey
Judoka at the 2019 European Games
Islamic Solidarity Games medalists in judo
Islamic Solidarity Games competitors for Turkey